Gosport Lifeboat Station  is a volunteer-operated independent lifeboat station charity located in the village of Alverstoke on the peninsula of Gosport in the English county of Hampshire. Owned and operated by Gosport and Fareham Inshore Rescue Service (GAFIRS), it operates free lifeboat services in the Solent from Portsmouth Harbour to Titchfield Haven, on the approaching shores of Southampton Water. GAFIRS is a charity registered in England and Wales (1159681).

GAFIRS is on call with HM Coastguard 24 hours a day, 365 days a year. When lifeboat crews are not on station, they are ready for an immediate launch via pager callout. In addition to the frontline lifeboat service, GAFIRS helps the county's other emergency services respond to inland incidents such as flooding, snow rescue and inland water rescues.

2009 marked the charity's 40th anniversary.

Independent status
There are 235 RNLI-owned lifeboat stations around the United Kingdom, and there are 65 lifeboat stations which are not owned or managed by the RNLI, such as GAFIRS. Like the RNLI, GAFIRS provides services to HM Coastguard whose equipment, training, policies and procedures comply with the Maritime and Coastguard Agency's Rescue Boat Code of Practice.

In 2010, GAFIRS and other independent lifeboat stations in the United Kingdom launched an awareness campaign to remove the common public misconception that there is only one charity "Saving Lives at Sea." The campaign, titled "Go Orange for Indie Lifeboat", aims to educate members of the public that donations to the RNLI may not actually be going towards their local lifeboat station if it is one of the independent ones, such as GAFIRS or Ryde Inshore Rescue.

Patron
The patron of Gosport and Fareham Inshore Rescue Service is yachtswoman Dee Caffari, who became patron on 17 October 2011, after the death of the previous patron Lady Margaret Fieldhouse.

Lifeboats and Rescue Vehicles

Gosport Lifeboat
The "Joan Dora Fuller", Search and Rescue call sign "Gosport Lifeboat," is a 9m Delta rigid hulled inflatable boat. It is powered by twin Yanmar 8LV, 4.42-litre turbo diesel V8s producing 320 hp each. Driving 2 x Hamilton waterjets via an electrically controlled reversible gearbox. The craft's maximum speed is 43 knots (50 mph) and can reach any part of the patrol area within 10 minutes of launch. The lifeboat has a variety of equipment to help rescue vessels and save lives. The kit includes advanced medical kit including an automatic external defibrillator (AED) and oxygen, search lights and thermal imaging cameras. There is also a VHF direction-finding equipment for homing in on a casualty vessel's radio transmissions, a chart plotter, tow lines, radar and depth sounder. The Lifeboat also features VHF radios for communications with the Coastguard, Gosport Lifeboat Station and casualties. In addition there is a tool kit with damage control items to stop leaks.

Gosport Inshore Lifeboat (Gosport ILB)
The "Ian Fuller", Search and Rescue call sign "Gosport ILB," is a 4.8m Ribcraft and the service's patrol craft and secondary lifeboat. She is powered by a single 60 hp outboard engine. A specially designed trailer enables her to be taken to inland incidents. She is equipped for rescue work including, Flares and para illumination flares, tow lines, GPS chart plotter, depth sounder, AIS and first aid kit (including AED and oxygen). The lifeboat has VHF radio and is DSC-compatible.

Gosport Rescue Mobile

The Gosport Rescue Mobile is a long-wheelbase landrover, which acts as an incident support vehicle both for inland incidents and shoreside assistant for the organisation's rescue craft. Gosport Rescue Mobile carries first aid, oxygen, paramedic equipment and rescue stretchers. Additionally it carries light rescue tools and scene lighting equipment for protracted incidents. The vehicle is also fitted with emergency blue lights and sirens which can be used by trained and licensed personnel (who are all part of the emergency services as a profession.)

Cadets and Canoe Lifeguard Section
The organisation has a Cadet Section for youths between the ages of 14 and 18. The aim of the section is to teach the youngsters lifesaving skills both in canoes and on the beach, as well as lifeguard skills. The service uses canoes for routine patrols and rescue work along the coastline of the area and additionally in support of the mud rescue teams. The canoes are normally paddled by the cadet section.

The canoes used are the 'Shark' rescue canoe, Selki rescue canoe and Plastic Sea Boats. The Shark was designed originally by the service to withstand the rigours of life as a rescue craft. The service has 14 rescue canoes and two paddle boards.

Incidents
The service attended 1,902 incidents from 1996 to 2011.

See also
 Independent lifeboats (British Isles)

References

External links
Gosport and Fareham Inshore Rescue Website
OnScene Magazine / Issue 1 / Summer 2013

Lifeboat stations in Hampshire
Independent Lifeboat stations
Sea rescue organisations of the United Kingdom
Organisations based in Hampshire